Crassispira pseudodanjouxi is an extinct species of sea snail, a marine gastropod mollusk in the family Pseudomelatomidae, the turrids and allies.

Description

Distribution
Fossils of this species have been found in Eocene strata in the Paris Basin in France.

References

 Brébion (P.), 1992 Quelques Cônes et Pleurotomes du Lutétien du Bassin de Paris. Cossmanniana, hors série, vol. 1, p. 1-25

pseudodanjouxi
Gastropods described in 1992